Luge at the 2020 Winter Youth Olympics took place at the St. Moritz-Celerina Olympic Bobrun from 17 to 20 January 2020.

Medal summary

Medal table

Medalists

Qualification
A total of 100 lugers will qualify to compete (50 per gender). A NOC can enter a maximum of two singles luge and one double. Quotas were officially awarded via the FIL Youth World Cup rankings as of o December 9, 2019.

Summary

References

External links
Results book – Luge

 
Youth Olympics
2020
2020 Winter Youth Olympics events
Luge in Switzerland